Cédric Elzéard (born 1 April 1975) is a French professional football manager and former player who played as a defender. As of the 2021–22 season, he is the head coach of Championnat National 3 club Prix-lès-Mézières.

Honours 
Sedan

 Coupe de France runner-up: 1998–99

Notes

References 

1975 births
Living people
People from Enghien-les-Bains
Footballers from Val-d'Oise
Paris Saint-Germain F.C. players
FC Saint-Leu 95 players
Amiens SC players
CS Sedan Ardennes players
Stade Brestois 29 players
US Créteil-Lusitanos players
French Division 3 (1971–1993) players
Championnat National 2 players
Championnat National players
Ligue 2 players
Ligue 1 players
Championnat National 3 players
French footballers